Eusko Sozialistak (ES) was a Basque socialist political party, with presence in the Spanish Basque Country. The leaders of ES were Javier Alonso and Mikel Salaberri .

History
ES was formed by members of the Christian socialist union Unión Sindical Obrera (USO) in October 1975. ES did not hold its first meeting until 13 November 1976. The organization was part of the Federation of Socialist Parties.

In July 1977 ES joined Herri Alderdi Sozialista Iraultzailea (HASI), which in turn would join Herri Batasuna in 1978.

ES was always critical of both ETA (m) and ETA (pm).

References

1975 establishments in Spain
Basque nationalism
Defunct socialist parties in the Basque Country (autonomous community)
Political parties established in 1975